Damir Bogdanović (born 8 July 1971 in Split) is a former Croatian handball player.

He played for RK Zamet for 12 years before taking a break to coach the youths at the club. In 2002 he played for one more season at the club before taking the sports director position.

Honours
Player
Croatian First A League
Vice-Champions (1): 1992
Croatian First B League
Winners (1): 1995-96
Croatian Cup
Finalist (1): 2000

Coach
3. HRL - West
Winners (1): 2011-12

References

Croatian male handball players
RK Zamet players
Yugoslav male handball players
Handball players from Rijeka
1971 births
Living people